Blue Moon is an album by jazz singer Carmen McRae, released on Decca Records in 1956.

Content
Allmusic critic Scott Yanow gave the album four out of five stars, stating:

Track listing
Side 1
 "Blue Moon" (Richard Rodgers, Lorenz Hart) - 2:35
 "My Foolish Heart" (Victor Young, Ned Washington) - 3:12
 "I Was Doing All Right" (George Gershwin, Ira Gershwin) - 2:49
 "Summer Is Gone" (Don Costa) - 3:27
 "I'm Putting All My Eggs in One Basket" (Irving Berlin) - 2:24
 "Nowhere" (Joe Mooney) - 2:45
Side 2
"Until the Real Thing Comes Along (Mann Holiner, Alberta Nichols, Saul Chaplin, Sammy Cahn, L.E. Freeman) - 3:23
"Lush Life (Billy Strayhorn) - 3:37
"Even If It Breaks My Heart" (Dick Carter, C. Henry Woods) - 2:35
"Laughing Boy" (Jack Segal) - 3:01
"Lilacs in the Rain" (Peter DeRose, Mitchell Parish) - 2:52
"All This Could Lead to Love" (Mundell Lowe, Walter Bishop, Sr.) - 3:12

References

1956 albums
Carmen McRae albums
Decca Records albums